Mount Balch is an east-west trending mountain with numerous sharp peaks, the highest 1,105 m, between Mount Peary and Mount Mill on Kyiv Peninsula, west coast of Graham Land. It was discovered by the French Antarctic Expedition of 1908–10 under Charcot and named by him for Edwin Swift Balch, an American author and authority on Antarctic exploration.

References
 SCAR Composite Gazetteer of Antarctica.

Mountains of Graham Land
Graham Coast